The Herring Tower is situated on the Langness Peninsula in the south of the Isle of Man. It was built by Thomas Brine in 1823. The tower was built as a daymark and was based on the style of the tower of Peel Castle. Since 1991 the Herring Tower has been protected as a registered building.

References

Towers in the Isle of Man
Registered Buildings of the Isle of Man